The Alliance for Workers' Liberty (AWL), also known as Workers' Liberty, is a Trotskyist group in Britain and Australia, which has been identified with the theorist Sean Matgamna throughout its history. It publishes the newspaper Solidarity.

History

Workers' Fight
The AWL traces its origins to the document What we are and what we must become, written by the tendency's founder Sean Matgamna in 1966, in which he argued that the Revolutionary Socialist League – by then effectively the Militant tendency – was too inward-looking, and needed to become more activist in its orientation. The RSL refused to circulate the document; hence, with a handful of supporters, he left to form the Workers' Fight group. Espousing left unity, they accepted an offer in 1968 to form a faction within the International Socialists (IS) as the Trotskyist Tendency.

Trotskyist Tendency
The Trotskyist Tendency clashed with the leadership of the International Socialists over many issues; for example, UK membership of the European Communities, on which the IS leadership itself was divided, and the use of the "Troops Out" slogan regarding Northern Ireland.

In December 1971, the leadership of the International Socialists called a special conference to "defuse" the TT. The TT described the "defusion" as an "expulsion" given that they did not wish to leave.

International-Communist League
Outside the IS, increased in size, the group resumed publication of Workers' Fight, now as a printed paper, not as was previously the case as a duplicated journal, began publication of a theoretical journal entitled Permanent Revolution and made efforts to publish a small number of workplace-oriented publications in specific industries.

At the end of 1975, it fused with the smaller Workers Power group, formerly the Left Faction within the IS, to form the International-Communist League. A small group of members in Bolton and Wigan opposed to the merger formed the Marxist Worker group, which later fused with the International Marxist Group. Workers' Fight was renamed Workers' Action and went over to a weekly publication schedule and the group's quarterly magazine was now entitled International-Communist. It joined with other groups that considered themselves to the left of the USFI in the Necessary International Initiative. In 1976, two-thirds of the ex-Workers Power group's members left in a dispute over Labour Party work and resumed a separate existence. The I-CL increased its activity within the Labour Party, and in 1978 helped set up the Socialist Campaign for a Labour Victory. This campaign proved relatively popular and initially involved a range of figures on the left of the Labour Party who wrote for and supported its newspaper, Socialist Organiser. After a dispute over whether local government rates should be increased to offset cuts made by the Thatcher government, most of the Labour left figures - including Ken Livingstone - withdrew from Socialist Organiser until the I-CL was the only force involved in what was now its central publication. Both Workers' Action and International-Communist were by 1979 discontinued, reflecting the group's entryism into the Labour Party.

Workers Socialist League
In 1981, the I-CL fused with Alan Thornett's Workers Socialist League which had now also entered the Labour Party. The new organisation, also called the Workers' Socialist League, mostly worked through the Socialist Organiser Alliance. It also produced a theoretical journal, Workers' Socialist Review. In 1984, the groups split apart. The key issue was the Falklands War: most of the former I-CL argued for the defeat of both sides; most of the former WSL supported a victory for Argentina. The tensions had also been strained over questions of internal democracy and differences over the national question.

Socialist Organiser Alliance
The Socialist Organiser Alliance grew from the broad-left Socialist Campaign for a Labour Victory. By 1983 the paper had become identified with Matgamna's supporters, leading to a split with Labour left politicians (such as Ken Livingstone) over the GLC's policy of increasing rates to offset cuts in central government grants to local councils.

The group organised its student work through the National Organisation of Labour Students (NOLS), forming Socialist Students in NOLS (SSiN) to campaign within the National Union of Students.

Throughout the 1980s the group had reassessed its politics and reappraised the Third Camp tradition of heterodox and dissident Trotskyists including Max Shachtman and Hal Draper. The group adopted a two-state position on Israel-Palestine, and in 1988, moved away from its original position that the Stalinist states were "deformed or degenerated workers states". By the 1990s the majority of organisation had adopted a bureaucratic collectivist analysis, with a minority holding a state capitalist position.

Alliance for Workers' Liberty

The newspaper Socialist Organiser was proscribed by the Labour Party conference in 1990. In response to the ban, the Socialist Organiser Alliance dissolved. In 1992, supporters of Socialist Organiser launched a new organisation known as the Alliance for Workers' Liberty. The AWL was involved in left unity initiatives such as the Socialist Alliance, Socialist Alliance Democracy Platform and Socialist Green Unity Coalition, and stood a parliamentary candidate in Camberwell and Peckham, while campaigning for Labour elsewhere. It also maintained a focus on pushing affiliated trade unions to assert themselves against the Labour leadership, and was involved in the establishment of the Labour Representation Committee in 2004.

In the late 1980s, it established and led a number of left opposition campaigns in the NUS, including Left Unity and the Campaign for Free Education and its supporters won seats in the structures of the NUS. Kat Fletcher, President of NUS from 2004 to 2006, was a member of the AWL and the Campaign for Free Education. It played leading roles in the NUS Women's and LGBT Campaigns, championing its policies on liberation and international solidarity within them, securing their representation within the NUS and working with groups such as OutRage! and Al-Fatiha. AWL was central to the Education Not for Sale network, and in 2010 helped found the National Campaign Against Fees and Cuts.

AWL has been more critical of political Islam than some other groups on the far left. In 2006, it reproduced the Muhammad cartoons that were originally published in Jyllands-Posten on its website, describing it as an issue of free speech. While it opposed the Iraq war, the group was critical of calls for the immediate withdrawal of US and UK forces, arguing that the likely consequence of a precipitate withdrawal would be increased sectarian violence that would snuff out the fledgling independent labour movement. A large minority within the organisation, while agreeing with the emphasis on solidarity with Iraqi workers, argued that the group should raise the call for the withdrawal of troops. These and other positions, including its support for a two-state settlement in Israel/Palestine, have led to other far-left groups characterising the AWL as "imperialist" and "Zionist".

In 2009, AWL members were central to sparking and supporting the sit-down strike of Vestas wind turbine factory workers on the Isle of Wight.

In 2018, a former member alleged that in 2005, when he was a 16 year old member of the group, he had been sexually assaulted twice by an older, and by then also former, member. The group responded, acknowledging the allegations and initiating an investigation, but a motion was passed at the London Young Labour conference in February 2018 to exclude AWL members/supporters from LYL spaces until the allegations were investigated.

Activities
The AWL has supported the newspaper Solidarity since 1995, and published it since 1999. It also published Workers' Liberty as a roughly quarterly magazine between 1985 and 2001. In 2001 and 2002, a second series of the magazine was published in a journal format. A third series of Workers' Liberty started in February 2006, taking the form of thematic collections issued as inserts within Solidarity. Women members of the AWL also publish a newspaper, Women's Fightback. AWL also publishes occasional books and pamphlets, including The Fate of the Russian Revolution (a collection of "critical Marxist" and Third Camp Trotskyist writings on Soviet Russia, mainly from the Workers' Party/Independent Socialist League tradition), Working-class politics and anarchism (exploring the commonalities and differences between class-struggle anarchist and syndicalist traditions and the AWL's own brand of libertarian-tinged Trotskyism), and Antonio Gramsci: Working-class revolutionary (a short appraisal of the life and thought of the Italian Marxist agitator, organiser, and educator Antonio Gramsci).

The AWL helped to set up and was active in campaigns such as No Sweat, Feminist Fightback, Workers' Climate Action, the National Campaign Against Fees and Cuts, and local community campaigns such as the Save Lewisham Hospital campaign and the One Choice, One Dream alliance in Southampton.

In trade union work, AWL members focus on developing workplace and industrial bulletins, and rank-and-file networks such as the Education Solidarity Network in the National Education Union. It produces workplace and industrial bulletins including Tubeworker (for London Underground workers) and Off The Rails (for mainline railway workers).

The group has international links with Workers' Liberty Australia and Solidarity in the United States. It has worked with groups on the left of the former Ligue Communiste Revolutionnaire (now part of the New Anticapitalist Party), and collaborated with Iraqi and Iranian groups from the Worker-Communist tradition. It also has links with L'Étincelle, a former fraction of Lutte ouvrière, the Iranian Revolutionary Marxist Tendency, and Turkish group Marksist Tutum.

The group advocated a "no" vote in the 2014 Scottish independence referendum. AWL members were also prominent in the Free Shahrokh Zamani and Reza Shahabi campaign, a solidarity campaign demanding the release of jailed Iranian trade unionists.

It supported Jeremy Corbyn in the 2015 Labour leadership campaign, and subsequently applied to the Electoral Commission to be de-registered as a political party, enabling its supporters to join the Labour Party. It campaigned against Brexit in the 2016 United Kingdom European Union membership referendum, and called on activists to campaign for Labour in the 2017 general election, and again in 2019.

In March 2022, Labour's National Executive Committee proscribed the AWL.

Notable former members 
 Journalist James Bloodworth
 Screenwriter Clive Bradley, who remains an active sympathiser of the group
 Newsnight Scotland presenter Gordon Brewer
 Rob Dawber, screenwriter of Ken Loach's The Navigators, who was still a member when he died
 Former National Union of Students president Kat Fletcher
 Political theorist Alan Johnson
 Former Labour MP Gloria De Piero
 Author and journalist Charlotte Raven
 Public and Commercial Services Union General Secretary Mark Serwotka
 The Guardian journalist Rajeev Syal
Social theorist Martyn Hudson

References

External links
Alliance for Workers' Liberty website
Catalogue of the Alliance for Workers' Liberty papers held at LSE Archives
Catalogue of the Socialist Organiser Alliance archives in Alan Clinton's papers, held at the Modern Records Centre, University of Warwick
Catalogue of the AWL archives, held at the Modern Records Centre, University of Warwick

1966 establishments in the United Kingdom
Anti-austerity political parties in the United Kingdom
Organisations associated with the Labour Party (UK)
Organizations established in 1966
Political parties established in 1993
Trotskyist organisations in the United Kingdom
Entryists